EWOM may refer to:

 Erasable Write-Only memory
 eWOM, Electronic word-of-mouth marketing
 Elemental: War of Magic, a fantasy strategy game